Bhanu Patel (date of birth not known) is a Ugandan former first-class cricketer.

Patel was born in Uganda Protectorate. He made a single appearance in first-class cricket for the East Africa cricket team against the touring Indians at Kampala in 1967. Batting from the tail, he was dismissed in both East African innings without scoring by Sadanand Mohol and B. S. Chandrasekhar. With the ball, he took the wickets of E. A. S. Prasanna and the Nawab of Pataudi to finish with match figures of 2 for 138. Between 1957 and 1970, Patel also played minor matches for Uganda. It was noted in The History of Cricket in Uganda that he "imparted much influence on the popularity of the game" in Uganda.

References

External links

Date of birth unknown
Possibly living people
Ugandan people of Indian descent
Ugandan cricketers
East African cricketers